The Carolina Blue Cup is a team handball tournament which has been organized by the Carolina THC (Team Handball Club) since 1990. The competition, which involves many United States teams and a few from Canada, has been dominated by clubs from New York State. It has been won the most times by New York Athletic Club.

History
The first tournament was held in 1990 which the SSC New Jersey won.

It is one of the largest and oldest handball tournament in the United States.

Record champion is the New York Athletic Club the club has also the most continues titles with eight.

Men

Tournaments

Medal count

Participation details

Women

Tournaments

See also
California Cup

References

External links
 All time medal table

Handball competitions in the United States
Blue Cup